Aline Chrétien (née Chaîné; May 14, 1936September 12, 2020) was a Canadian academic administrator who was the wife of Canada's 20th prime minister, Jean Chrétien.  She previously worked as a secretary, payroll manager, and model.  In her later life, she was a trained pianist with The Royal Conservatory of Music.

Early life and family
Aline Chaîné was born on May 14, 1936, in Shawinigan, Quebec, the eldest child of Yvonne (Bellemar) and Albert Chaîné. Her mother was a hairdresser; her father worked at a power plant.  She left school at age 16 and never attended university but took correspondence courses while working as a secretary.  She was also employed as a payroll manager and did some modelling for local clothing stores.

Chaîné married lawyer Jean Chrétien on September 10, 1957. They had two sons, Hubert and Michel Chrétien (adopted), and one daughter, France Chrétien Desmarais.  After her husband was elected to Parliament, she taught herself English, Italian, and Spanish, and became fluent in those languages in addition to her native French.

Spouse of the prime minister
On November 5, 1995, an intruder, André Dallaire, broke into the Prime Minister's residence at 24 Sussex Drive, in Ottawa, Ontario. Awakened next to her sleeping husband, Chrétien confronted the intruder at their bedroom door. Seeing that he was armed with a large knife, she slammed the door and locked it, then woke her husband.

Jean Chrétien often sought out his wife's advice. Maclean's magazine in 1996 listed her first among his most influential advisors, saying "Never mind calling her the power behind the throne—she shares the seat of power."  In the same magazine in 2000, Allan Fotheringham described Jean and Aline Chrétien as the two "most powerful" politicians in Canada, above Eddie Goldenberg and Jean Pelletier.

Jean Chrétien has publicly stated that his wife was his key advisor. He once joked that Canada is run exclusively by women: the monarch, the Governor General, and the Chief Justice of Canada were all women, and Madame Chrétien was pulling the strings of the prime minister.  He made similar jokes often, once telling a reporter that he did not know when the next election would be because he had not yet asked Aline to set a date.

In her role as the prime minister's spouse, Chrétien went to the memorial of the victim of the W. R. Myers High School shooting in 1999, along with Alberta Premier Ralph Klein, Opposition Leader Preston Manning, and the Attorney General of Canada Anne McLellan.  She was awarded her first honorary degree from Laurentian University in 2003.

Later years
Chrétien was active in a number of charitable organizations from the time that her husband was first elected to the House of Commons of Canada in 1963.  In addition to her keen interest in languages, she took piano courses during her 50s and became an advocate for The Royal Conservatory of Music in Toronto.  Jean Chrétien purchased a grand piano for her using the damages he was awarded in a libel case against The Globe and Mail.

On September 22, 2010, Chrétien was named as the first chancellor of Laurentian University, a bilingual educational institution in Sudbury, Ontario.

Chrétien suffered from Alzheimer's disease.  She died on September 12, 2020, at her home in Lac des Piles near Shawinigan.  She was 84 and had celebrated her 63rd wedding anniversary two days before.  No cause of death was disclosed.

See also
 Spouse of the prime minister of Canada

Notes

References

1936 births
2020 deaths
Canadian academic administrators
Canadian university and college chancellors
Canadian women academics
Fellows of the Royal Conservatory of Music
French Quebecers
Jean Chrétien
People from Mauricie
Spouses of prime ministers of Canada
The Royal Conservatory of Music alumni
Women academic administrators